The Central District of Hamadan County is a district (bakhsh) in Hamadan County, Hamadan Province, Iran. At the 2006 census, its population was 560,133, in 150,032 families.  The District has three cities: Hamadan, Maryanaj, and Juraqan. The District has six rural districts (dehestan): Abaru Rural District, Alvandkuh-e Gharbi Rural District, Alvandkuh-e Sharqi Rural District, Gonbad Rural District, Hegmataneh Rural District, and Sangestan Rural District.

References 

Hamadan County
Districts of Hamadan Province